Rainbow Mountain or Rainbow Mountains may refer to:

 Rainbow Mountain (Alabama) in Alabama, USA
 Rainbow Mountain (British Columbia) in British Columbia, Canada
 Rainbow Mountain (California) in California, USA
 Rainbow Mountain (Montana) in Montana, USA
 Rainbow Mountain Wilderness, a wilderness area centered around Rainbow Mountain near Las Vegas, Nevada
 Rainbow Mountain (Peru) in the Andes of Peru
 Rainbow Mountain (Washington) in Washington, USA
 Rainbow Mountain in New Zealand (dual official name with Maunga Kākaramea)
 Rainbow Range (Chilcotin Plateau), a mountain range in British Columbia, Canada
 Rainbow Range (Rocky Mountains), a mountain range in British Columbia, Canada
 Spectrum Range, a mountain range in British Columbia, Canada
 Rainbow Mountains (China) in Zhangye National Geopark  within the prefecture-level city of Zhangye, in Gansu, China